The following is a partial list of the "G" codes for Medical Subject Headings (MeSH), as defined by the United States National Library of Medicine (NLM).

This list continues the information at List of MeSH codes (G06). Codes following these are found at List of MeSH codes (G08). For other MeSH codes, see List of MeSH codes.

The source for this content is the set of 2006 MeSH Trees from the NLM.

– physiological processes

– adaptation, physiological
  – acclimatization
  – estivation
  – hibernation

– body constitution
  – body weights and measures
  – body mass index
  – body size
  – body height
  – body weight
  – birth weight
  – fetal weight
  – overweight
  – obesity
  – obesity, morbid
  – thinness
  – body surface area
  – crown-rump length
  – organ size
  – skinfold thickness
  – waist-hip ratio
  – disease susceptibility
  – somatotypes

– body temperature
  – body temperature regulation
  – hibernation
  – sweating
  – thermogenesis
  – shivering
  – skin temperature

– cell physiology
  – cell cycle
  – cell division
  – cell nucleus division
  – anaphase
  – chromosome segregation
  – meiosis
  – meiotic prophase i
  – chromosome pairing
  – synaptonemal complex
  – pachytene stage
  – metaphase
  – mitosis
  – anaphase
  – metaphase
  – prometaphase
  – prophase
  – telophase
  – prometaphase
  – prophase
  – meiotic prophase i
  – chromosome pairing
  – synaptonemal complex
  – pachytene stage
  – telophase
  – cytokinesis
  – interphase
  – g0 phase
  – g1 phase
  – g2 phase
  – s phase
  – cell differentiation
  – adipogenesis
  – gametogenesis
  – oogenesis
  – vitellogenesis
  – spermatogenesis
  – sperm maturation
  – cell growth processes
  – cell enlargement
  – cell proliferation
  – cell division
  – cell nucleus division
  – anaphase
  – chromosome segregation
  – meiosis
  – meiotic prophase i
  – chromosome pairing
  – synaptonemal complex
  – pachytene stage
  – metaphase
  – mitosis
  – anaphase
  – metaphase
  – prometaphase
  – prophase
  – telophase
  – prometaphase
  – prophase
  – meiotic prophase i
  – chromosome pairing
  – synaptonemal complex
  – pachytene stage
  – telophase
  – cytokinesis
  – cell lineage
  – cell shape
  – cell size

– chronobiology
  – biological clocks
  – periodicity
  – circadian rhythm
  – activity cycles

– electrophysiology
  – electric capacitance
  – electric conductivity
  – electric impedance
  – evoked potentials
  – contingent negative variation
  – event-related potentials, p300
  – evoked potentials, auditory
  – cochlear microphonic potentials
  – evoked potentials, auditory, brain stem
  – evoked potentials, motor
  – evoked potentials, somatosensory
  – evoked potentials, visual
  – excitatory postsynaptic potentials
  – membrane potentials
  – action potentials
  – myoelectric complex, migrating

– growth and development
  – aging
  – longevity
  – growth
  – body size
  – body height
  – body weight
  – birth weight
  – body weight changes
  – weight gain
  – weight loss
  – fetal weight
  – overweight
  – obesity
  – obesity, morbid
  – thinness
  – cell growth processes
  – cell enlargement
  – cell proliferation
  – cell division
  – cell nucleus division
  – anaphase
  – chromosome segregation
  – meiosis
  – meiotic prophase i
  – chromosome pairing
  – synaptonemal complex
  – pachytene stage
  – metaphase
  – mitosis
  – anaphase
  – metaphase
  – prometaphase
  – prophase
  – telophase
  – prometaphase
  – prophase
  – meiotic prophase i
  – chromosome pairing
  – synaptonemal complex
  – pachytene stage
  – telophase
  – cytokinesis
  – organ size
  – tropism
  – gravitropism
  – phototropism
  – human development
  – adolescent development
  – child development
  – morphogenesis
  – body patterning
  – embryonic induction
  – embryonic and fetal development
  – ectogenesis
  – embryonic development
  – cell lineage
  – embryonic induction
  – fetal development
  – fetal movement
  – fetal organ maturity
  – fetal viability
  – fetal weight
  – gestational age
  – organogenesis
  – fetal organ maturity
  – lymphangiogenesis
  – musculoskeletal development
  – bone development
  – calcification, physiologic
  – maxillofacial development
  – osteogenesis
  – chondrogenesis
  – muscle development
  – odontogenesis
  – amelogenesis
  – cementogenesis
  – dentinogenesis
  – sex differentiation
  – metamorphosis, biological
  – life cycle stages
  – larva
  – nymph
  – pupa
  – molting

– homeostasis
  – acid-base equilibrium
  – body temperature regulation
  – thermogenesis
  – feedback, biochemical
  – down-regulation
  – up-regulation
  – heat-shock response
  – water-electrolyte balance
  – kallikrein-kinin system
  – water loss, insensible

– somatotypes

The list continues at List of MeSH codes (G08).

G07